Ahmadi Rural District is a rural district (dehestan) in the Ahmadi District of Hajjiabad County, Hormozgan Province, Iran. At the 2006 census, its population was 5,261, in 1,215 families.  The rural district has 36 villages.

References 

Rural Districts of Hormozgan Province
Hajjiabad County